Lucien Pellat-Finet is a French designer. He specialise in cashmere and started with knitted luxurious sweaters.  Intarsia knitters from Edinburgh are used to knit the sweaters since the area is known for producing high-end cashmere. The label has a store in London and in New York.

References 

French fashion designers